Logan Hospital is the major health centre servicing the Logan region in the state of Queensland and provides a range of speciality services for children and adults. Located at the corner of Armstrong and Loganlea Roads in Meadowbrook, Queensland, Australia.

It provides acute medical, surgical, rehabilitation, and maternity services for children and adults. As of 2018, the emergency department is the second busiest in Queensland, seeing more than 88,000 presentations each year.

Logan Hospital serves patients who are generally younger, have culturally or linguistically diverse backgrounds, and have an income below the national median.

Logan Hospital has grown from a 48-bed community hospital in 1990 to a 448-bed hospital today, mirroring the rapid growth in population in the Logan region.

Logan Hospital provides true general medical experience for nursing, medical and allied health trainees and graduates with exposure to a wide spectrum of medical conditions. The new rehabilitation unit, MAPU, orthogeriatric and perioperative services started in 2014 and early 2015. The hospital is affiliated to Griffith University.

The hospital's services include mental health, palliative care, and the medical & surgical services of obstetrics, gynaecology, orthopaedics, ear nose & throat, paediatrics, respiratory medicine, neurology, endocrinology, cardiology, renal dialysis, anaesthetics, emergency medicine, specialist outpatient clinics, oral health, pathology, medical imaging, allied health services, and pharmacy.

History
In 1993, the hospital was included in a reference group for intercultural collaboration.

In December 2013, Logan Hospital was the site of a protest against a reduction in midwifery services.

Further stages have been built since opening and Logan Hospital now has increased in size and provides a wide range of services. In 2012, work began on a new emergency department as well as a children's inpatient and rehabilitation unit.

An expansion plan was drawn up in 2019.  It noted the rapid population growth in the area, above the state average.

Abortion controversy

In 2016 Logan Hospital's Department of Obstetrics and Gynaecology controversially made a written submission to the Parliamentary Committee on the Abortion Law Reform Amendment Bill 2016. This submission requested that medical practitioners who were conscientious objectors be exempt from the legal obligation to participate in terminations. It also proposed that medical practitioners could refuse to refer a woman in need of a termination to another doctor for ongoing care. There was no specific mention in this submission as to whether the exemption would apply in the circumstance of a pregnant woman's life being at risk.

For pregnant women in the Logan Hospital catchment this is highly relevant to their care in pregnancy, as maternal deaths have occurred in the context of restrictive abortion policy, including the 2012 death of Savita Halappanavar in Ireland.

The submission on behalf of the Department of Obstetrics and Gynaecology drew public attention and media coverage because it effectively excludes women living in Brisbane's south from abortion access within the public health system, as the only other public hospital in the catchment is the Mater Women's and Children's Hospital, which is Catholic and actively anti-abortion.

See also

List of hospitals in Australia

References

External links
Facility profile – Queensland Government

Hospital buildings completed in 1990
Hospitals in Queensland
Buildings and structures in Logan City
1990 establishments in Australia
Hospitals established in 1990